Benny Williams may refer to:
 Benny Williams (musician)
 Benny Williams (basketball)
 Benny Williams (footballer)

See also
 Ben Williams (disambiguation)
 Benjamin Williams (disambiguation)